Josef H. Neumann (born May 27, 1953) is a German Art Photographer, media designer and art historian. He invented the chemogram, an experimental artform involving manipulating chemicals in film photography.

Life

Education 
From 1967 to 1970 Josef H. Neumann was apprenticed at the photographer Gustav Wenning in his birthplace Rheine. From 1974 to 1978 he studied visual communication at the Dortmund University of Applied Sciences, after completing his degree as a photo designer in 1978 with a degree and intermediate diploma in journalism, philosophy and art history at the Westphalian Wilhelms University in Münster in 1986.

Neumann married in 1991 the teacher and kindergarten director Martina Flügel. The marriage was dissolved in the year of 2003. 
He is legally married to Venezuelan Verónica Cristina López Pérez, Physiotherapist, since March 2020 in Moche, Trujillo, Peru according to the Hague Apostille.  They have been living separately in Santiago de Chile and Dortmund since 2022, as the Embajada in Lima has been refusing visas for a trip to Germany since 2021.

Artistic work 
Since 1979 Neumann lectured at intervals at the Dortmund University of Applied Sciences and Arts in the fields photo design and social work. He also had an assignment for Designing with Electronic Media ("Gestaltung mit elektronischen Medien") with the department of computer science of the Dortmund University of Applied Sciences and Arts for 20 years.

Since 1986 Neumann photographed for various publishing houses in Germany, Austria, France and Switzerland. Neumann mainly worked for the publisher C. J. Bucher (Munich) while often using the Russian panorama camera Horizont. Several panorama illustrated books were published, including Paris, Vienna, Switzerland, Munich, Germany, Tuscany und Sicily.

His illustrated book Deutschland was awarded twice – in the years 1987 and 1990 – with the Kodak-Fotobuchpreis. In addition, this book has a preface by president Richard von Weizsäcker and was published with an edition of more than 40.000 copies. As the German government has given one copy as a present to each host for several years the book has a worldwide spread.

While having an academic status at the Dortmund University of Applied Sciences and Arts in the department of design from 1986 to 1987 Neumann wrote two standard references Filme kreativ nutzen (Using films creatively) and Objektive kreativ nutzen (Using lenses creatively) together with Harald Mante in 1986 and 1988.

1993 Neumann lectured at the former Fachhochschule Köln (now Technical University of Cologne) in the department of photo engineering.

After intensive and creative research in the new camera generation Zoom-Kompakte his book Zoomkompakte kreativ was published in 1994 on occasion of the 75th anniversary of the Japanese camera company Asahi Optical Joint Stock Co. alias Pentax.

In his city of residence Neumann collaborated with his Gerhard P. Müller and they created two voluminous illustrated books on church treasures of Dortmund, which were published in 1987 and 1999.

Since 2003 Neumann has artistically worked at intervals in Portugal (Algarve) on photo and video productions.

Josef H. Neumann is a member of the German Society for Photography (DGPh) since 1986th

Im Januar 2012 he opened his atelier INICIO.de together with the Agentinian artist Virginia Novarin in the Unionviertel in Dortmund.

Today Neumann works as freelancing photo designer producing image and product commercials for print and video. In addition Neumann regularly works as lecturer on didactic methods of photography for public institutions and private companies.

Neumann published for all major German photographic journals like Color Foto, Foto, Fotoheft, Fotomagazin, Minolta Mirror, Nikon News, Photo, Photographie, Photo Revue, Professional Camera, ProfiFoto,  fineartphotomagazine. His photographs have been used in numerous German and European publications wow Creative Photography, Relais & Châteaux, Brigitte, Natur, Freizeit Revue, S.Fischer Verlag, Suhrkamp Verlag and Time.

Editorial work 
From 1981 to 1996 Neumann was member of the editorial team of the German magazine Photographie in Düsseldorf and Zürich.

At the same time Neumann was chief editor of the German magazine Fotoheft from 1990 to 1992.

Research 

1974 Experimental advancements of Chemigrams to Chemograms, in which photographic images are first processesed onto photographic paper and then chemicals are additionally applied onto it

1976 First successful tests in producing "edible photo prints" using screen printing and coinage of the term

1992 Foundation of the company FOTOMeDIA and research with focus on electronic processing of pictures for multimedia projects.

1993 DIPO DIGITAL POSTCARD Development, registration at the DPMA and marketing of the first DIPO DIGITAL POSTCARD on disk

1998 Completion of research (begun in 1976) regarding the production of "edible photo prints" using piezotechnology and food colors.

2000 As part of his teaching position at the FB Allgemeine INFORMATIK at the Dortmund University of Applied Sciences, Josef H. Neumann and his students, in charge of Stephan Rosegger, opened the first INTERNET GALLERY on the World Wide Web in a pilot project in cooperation with the engineering company ICN.de.

Publications

Illustrated books 
 Sizilien. C. J. Bucher Verlag, Lucerne/Munich 2001, 
 Wien. C. J. Bucher Verlag, Lucerne/Munich 1989, 
 München. C. J. Bucher Verlag, Lucerne/Munich 1987, 
 Der Harz. C. J. Bucher Verlag, Lucerne/Munich 1986, 
 Deutschland. C. J. Bucher Verlag, Lucerne/Munich 1986,  Ausgezeichnet mit dem »Kodak Fotobuchpreis« 1987 und 1990
 Paris. C. J. Bucher Verlag, Lucerne/Munich 1986, 
 Schweiz. Suisse. Svizzera. C. J. Bucher Verlag, Lucerne/Munich 1986, 
 Mit Lust und Laune durch den Märkischen Kreis. Lüdenscheid 2001, 
 Dortmunder Dorfkirchen. (co-authors Dore Boleg-Vieweg, Gerhard P. Müller), Verlag Ruhfus Dortmund 1998 
 Toskana. (co-authors Gerhard P. Müller, Axel M. Mosler, Martin Thomas) C. J. Bucher Verlag, Lucerne/Munich 1986,  
 Dortmunder Kirchen des Mittelalters. (co-authors Wolfgang Rinke,Gerhard P. Müller,), Verlag Ruhfus Dortmund 1986 
 Dortmunder Bilder und Gedanken. (co-authors Jutta Ohrmann, Dieter Menne, Gerhard P. Müller), Verlag Ruhfus Dortmund 1986

Educational books on photography 
 Zoomkompakte kreativ. Verlag Photographie, Schaffhausen 1994, 
 Filme kreativ nutzen. (co-author Harald Mante), Verlag Photographie, Schaffhausen 1988, 
 Objektive kreativ nutzen. (co-author Harald Mante), Verlag Photographie, Schaffhausen 1986,

Exhibitions 
 2018 Chemogramm – Josef H. Neumann, Museo de Arte Moderno, Bucaramanga (Colombia)
 1989 Paris – Panorama Galerie Nikkor Club, Gladbeck
 1989 „Blow Up," Farblaserkopien, Cafe Einstein, Dortmund
 1979 „Landschaft und Figur" Galerie Studio Freund/Sommer, Iserlohn
 1978 Chemogramme Galerie Keller-Holtz, Rheda Wiedenbrück
 1978 Chemogramme Galerie Stiegemann/Patzelt, Siegburg
 1977 Chemogramme Galerie Wendland. Jun., Schüttorf
 1976 Chemogramme und Fotoobjekte, Stadtsparkasse Rheine
 1976 Chemogramme Fotografik-Studio-Galerie Professor Pan Walther, Münster

Group exhibitions 
 2021 Grafik aus Dortmund DEPOT, Dortmund
 2016 Einblicke Torhaus Rombergpark, Dortmund
 2016 Grafik aus Dortmund Berswordthalle, Dortmund
 2015 Einblicke Torhaus Rombergpark, Dortmund
 2015 Grafik aus Dortmund Berswordthalle, Dortmund
 2012 „Atelier Inicio" Dortmund, mit Virginia Novarin, Zeichnungen und Chemogramme, Dortmund
 1986 Stadtmuseum München
 1985 Kurhaus Füssen Kunstausstellung Amnesty International
 1978 Landesbildstelle Bremen, Harald Mante und Studenten
 1978 Bildstelle des Landes Baden-Württemberg, Stuttgart
 1978 Höhere Graphische Lehr-und Versuchsanstalt Wien
 1978 Photo-Expo-Metro, Exhibition, Paris
 1978 Folkwang Museum Essen, Otto Steinert Preis "Figur und Landschaft"
 1978 Photokina Cologne in: German Society for Photography

Awards 
 2016 Kunstankauf Stadt Dortmund (Chemogram,Print Alentejo, Portugal)
 2015 Kunstankauf Stadt Dortmund (Chemograms;Prints Phoenix I and Phoenix II)
 2000 EXPO 2000 Hannover.  Presentation and Qualification of the awarded several times Panoramaworks GERMANY in the Stand of the German Delegation.
 1990 Kodak Fotobuchpreis für den Titel Deutschland.
 1987 Kodak Fotobuchpreis für den Titel Deutschland.
 1981/82 NIKON-Contest International 2. Preis, Düsseldorf
 1979 Newcomer-Award PROFESSIONAL CAMERA 2. Preis, Munich
 1978 Otto Steinert Preis Honorable Mention "Figur und Landschaft", Folkwang Museum Essen
 1978 Photo-Expo-Metro Concurso Honorable Mention Paris
 1978 Photokina Cologne in: German Society for Photography
 1977/78 NIKON-Contest International 3. Preis, Düsseldorf

Notes

External links 
 
 www.chemogramme.de
 www.fotomedia.de
 www.josef-h-neumann.de

1953 births
Living people
Photographers from North Rhine-Westphalia
People from Rheine